North Ostrobothnia is a region of Finland. It borders the Finnish regions of Lapland, Kainuu, North Savo, Central Finland and Central Ostrobothnia, as well as the Russian Republic of Karelia. The easternmost corner of the region between Lapland, Kainuu and the Russian border is known as Koillismaa ("North-East Finland").

Historical provinces

Municipalities 

The region of North Ostrobothnia is made up of 30 municipalities, of which 11 have city status (marked in bold).

Koillismaa sub-region:
Kuusamo (16,177)
Taivalkoski (4,407)
Nivala–Haapajärvi sub-region:
Haapajärvi (7,640)
Kärsämäki (2,758)
Nivala (11,053)
Pyhäjärvi (5,879)
Reisjärvi (2,992)
Oulu sub-region:
Hailuoto (989)
Kempele (16,303)
Liminka (9,178)
Lumijoki (2,041)
Muhos (8,936)
Oulu (192,680)
Tyrnävä (6,482)

Oulunkaari sub-region:
Ii (9,581)
Pudasjärvi (8,717)
Utajärvi (2,952)
Vaala (3,309)
Raahe sub-region:
Pyhäjoki (3,350)
Raahe (22,606)
Siikajoki (5,617)
Siikalatva sub-region:
Haapavesi (7,287)
Pyhäntä (1,581)
Siikalatva (6,070)
Ylivieska sub-region:
Alavieska (2,750)
Kalajoki (12,589)
Merijärvi (1,199)
Oulainen (7,912)
Sievi (5,279)
Ylivieska (14,307)

Politics
Results of the 2019 Finnish parliamentary election in North Ostrobothnia:

 Centre Party   30.15%
 Finns Party   20.38%
 Left Alliance   12.10%
 National Coalition Party   11.53%
 Social Democratic Party   10.40%
 Green League   8.16%
 Christian Democrats   2.22%
 Blue Reform   0.75%
 Movement Now   0.65%
 Seven Star Movement   0.35%
 Swedish People's Party   0.18%
 Other parties   3.13%

References

External links 

North Ostrobothnia (official site).

 
Ostrobothnia, North